In comedy, a throwaway line (also: throwaway joke or throwaway gag) is a joke delivered "in passing" without being the punch line to a comedy routine, part of the build up to another joke, or (in the context of drama) there to advance a story or develop a character. Throwaway lines are often one-liners, or in-jokes, and often delivered in a deadpan manner.

In comic strips (Sunday comics in particular) throwaway gags are often placed in the throwaway panels of the comic, and are located there so that removing the throwaway panels for space reasons will not destroy the narrative of the central comic.

In episodic fiction, a line intended originally as a throwaway line in one episode may later be retconned by being incorporated into the back-story of the main drama, and used to develop the longer-term plot. As an example, in the second season of Breaking Bad the character Saul Goodman, threatened at gunpoint by a masked Walter White and Jesse Pinkman, makes assumptions about his kidnapping and tries to defuse the situation by blaming a person named Ignacio and referencing someone named Lalo - who are never mentioned again in the series; despite this, Ignacio Varga and Lalo Salamanca were later written into full-fledged characters in the spin-off/prequel series Better Call Saul, produced several years later.

Comedy
Drama
Jokes